Bernadette Banner (born ) is an American YouTuber, author, and former costume assistant currently based in London. She is known for her interest in and promotion of historical dress reconstruction and study of a range of historical fashion periods from the early Medieval era to World War I, with a primary focus on the Victorian and Edwardian eras. She has focused on the lack of quality in modern fast fashion. She is also known for sewing in Original Practice, the art of crafting clothes using historically informed methods and materials.

A significant area investigated by Banner has been the accuracy in reproductions of historical clothing, for example in films like Little Women (2019) and Beauty and the Beast (2017). In addition, she has also been featured by Glamour as commentary for an analysis of Mary Poppins' dressing.

In 2019, a 15th-century-inspired gown Banner made was poorly copied and sold by an online merchant using Banner's photo  in the sales listing. Banner bought the dress and made a public video in which she criticized its poor construction.

On her channel, Banner is an active spokesperson against the fast fashion industry, highlighting its environmental devastation and poor labor practices as reason for people to do what they can to abstain from buying clothes from such brands. In place of consuming fast fashion products, Banner has described her own move towards limiting her number of wardrobe pieces to sustainable and long-lasting garments, many of which she has created herself.

Banner studied in the Design and Production Studio at Tisch School of the Arts. After that, she did an internship for Tony Award-winning costume designer Jenny Tiramani at the School of Historical Dress in London. She formerly worked as a costume assistant for Broadway, and later on a parody preview video of the Broadway musical Frozen.

In 2022, she authored a non-fiction book, Make, Sew and Mend, published by Page Street Publishing. It was a BookScan trade paperback bestseller for the third week of May.

Publications 
Banner, Bernadette. Make, Sew and Mend: Traditional Techniques to Sustainably Maintain and Refashion Your Clothes. United States: Page Street Publishing, 2022.

References

External links 
 Official website
 
 YouTube channel review in The Daily Star

History of clothing
Fashion YouTubers
Living people
Patreon creators
1990s births
Fashion historians